In psychology and behavioral economics, the endowment effect (also known as divestiture aversion and related to the mere ownership effect in social psychology) is the finding that people are more likely to retain an object they own than acquire that same object when they do not own it.  The endowment theory can be defined as "an application of prospect theory positing that loss aversion associated with ownership explains observed exchange asymmetries."

This is typically illustrated in two ways. In a valuation paradigm, people's maximum willingness to pay (WTP) to acquire an object is typically lower than the least amount they are willing to accept (WTA) to give up that same object when they own it—even when there is no cause for attachment, or even if the item was only obtained minutes ago. In an exchange paradigm, people given a good are reluctant to trade it for another good of similar value. For example, participants first given a Swiss chocolate bar were generally willing to trade it for a coffee mug, whereas participants first given the coffee mug were generally unwilling to trade it for the chocolate bar.

A more controversial third paradigm used to elicit the endowment effect is the mere ownership paradigm, primarily used in experiments in psychology, marketing, and organizational behavior. In this paradigm, people who are randomly assigned to receive a good ("owners") evaluate it more positively than people who are not randomly assigned to receive the good ("controls"). The distinction between this paradigm and the first two is that it is not incentive-compatible. In other words, participants are not explicitly incentivized to reveal the extent to which they truly like or value the good.

The endowment effect can be equated to the behavioural model willingness to accept or pay (WTAP), a formula sometimes used to find out how much a consumer or person is willing to put up with or lose for different outcomes.  However, this model has come under recent criticism as potentially inaccurate.

Examples
One of the most famous examples of the endowment effect in the literature is from a study by Daniel Kahneman, Jack Knetsch & Richard Thaler, in which participants were given a mug and then offered the chance to sell it or trade it for an equally valued alternative (pens). They found that the amount participants required as compensation for the mug once their ownership of the mug had been established ("willingness to accept") was approximately twice as high as the amount they were willing to pay to acquire the mug ("willingness to pay").

Other examples of the endowment effect include work by Ziv Carmon and Dan Ariely, who found that participants' hypothetical selling price (willingness to accept or WTA) for NCAA final four tournament tickets were 14 times higher than their hypothetical buying price (willingness to pay or WTP). Also, work by Hossain and List (Working Paper) discussed in the Economist in 2010, showed that workers worked harder to maintain ownership of a provisionally awarded bonus than they did for a bonus framed as a potential yet-to-be-awarded gain. In addition to these examples, the endowment effect has been observed using different goods in a wide range of different populations, including children, great apes, and new world monkeys.

Background
The endowment effect has been observed from ancient times:

Psychologists first noted the difference between consumers' WTP and WTA as early as the 1960s. The term endowment effect however was first explicitly coined by the economist Richard Thaler in reference to the under-weighting of opportunity costs as well as the inertia introduced into a consumer's choice processes when goods included in their endowment become more highly valued than goods that are not. In the years that followed, extensive investigations into the endowment effect have been conducted producing a wealth of interesting empirical and theoretical findings.

Theoretical explanations

Loss aversion
It was proposed by Kahneman and his colleagues that the endowment effect is, in part, due to the fact that once a person owns an item, forgoing it feels like a loss, and humans are loss-averse. They go on to suggest that the endowment effect, when considered as a facet of loss-aversion, would thus violate the Coase theorem, and was described as inconsistent with standard economic theory which asserts that a person's willingness to pay (WTP) for a good should be equal to their willingness to accept (WTA) compensation to be deprived of the good, a hypothesis which underlies consumer theory and indifference curves. However, these claims have been disputed and other researchers claim that psychological inertia, differences in reference prices relied on by buyers and sellers, and ownership (attribution of the item to self) and not loss aversion are the key to this phenomenon.

Psychological inertia
David Gal proposed a psychological inertia account of the endowment effect. In this account, sellers require a higher price to part with an object than buyers are willing to pay because neither has a well-defined, precise valuation for the object and therefore there is a range of prices over which neither buyers nor sellers have much incentive to trade. For example, in the case of Kahneman et al.'s (1990) classic mug experiments (where sellers demanded about $7 to part with their mug whereas buyers were only willing to pay, on average, about $3 to acquire a mug) there was likely a range of prices for the mug ($4 to $6) that left the buyers and sellers without much incentive to either acquire or part with it. Buyers and sellers therefore maintained the status quo out of inertia. Conversely, a high price ($7 or more) yielded a meaningful incentive for an owner to part with the mug; likewise, a relatively low price ($3 or less) yielded a meaningful incentive for a buyer to acquire the mug.

Reference-dependent accounts
According to reference-dependent theories, consumers first evaluate the potential change in question as either being a gain or a loss. In line with prospect theory (Tversky and Kahneman, 1979), changes that are framed as losses are weighed more heavily than are the changes framed as gains. Thus an individual owning "A" amount of a good, asked how much he/she would be willing to pay to acquire "B", would be willing to pay a value (B-A) that is lower than the value that he/she would be willing to accept to sell (C-A) units; the value function for perceived gains is not as steep as the value function for perceived losses.

Figure 1 presents this explanation in graphical form.  An individual at point A, asked how much he/she would be willing to accept (WTA) as compensation to sell X units and move to point C, would demand greater compensation for that loss than he/she would be willing to pay for an equivalent gain of X units to move him/her to point B. Thus the difference between (B-A) and (C-A) would account for the endowment effect. In other words, he/she expects more money while selling; but wants to pay less while buying the same amount of goods.

Figure 1 : Prospect Theory and the Endowment Effect

Neoclassical explanations
Hanemann (1991), develops a neoclassical explanation for the endowment effect, accounting for the effect without invoking prospect theory.

Figure 2 presents this explanation in graphical form. In the figure, two indifference curves for a particular good X and wealth are given. Consider an individual who is given goods X such they move from point A (where they have X0 of good X) to point B (where they have the same wealth and X1 of good X). Their WTP represented by the vertical distance from B to C, because (after giving up that amount of wealth) the individual is indifferent about being at A or C. Now consider an individual who gives up goods such that they move from B to A. Their WTA represented by the (larger) vertical distance from A to D because (after receiving that much wealth) they are indifferent about either being at point B or D. Shogren et al. (1994) has reported findings that lend support to Hanemann's hypothesis.  However, Kahneman, Knetsch, and Thaler (1991) find that the endowment effect continues even when wealth effects are fully controlled for.

Figure 2 : Hanemann's Endowment Effect Explanation

When goods are indivisible, a coalitional game can be set up so that a utility function can be defined on all subsets of the goods.
Hu (2020) shows the endowment effect when the utility function is superadditive, i.e., the value of the whole is greater than the sum of its parts. Hu (2020) also introduces a few unbiased solutions which mitigate endowment bias.

Connection-based, or "psychological ownership" theories
Connection-based theories propose that the attachment or association with the self-induced by owning a good is responsible for the endowment effect (for a review, see Morewedge & Giblin, 2015). Work by Morewedge, Shu, Gilbert and Wilson (2009) provides support for these theories, as does work by Maddux et al. (2010). For example, research participants who were given one mug and asked how much they would pay for a second mug ("owner-buyers") were WTP as much as "owners-sellers," another group of participants who were given a mug and asked how much they were WTA to sell it (both groups valued the mug in question more than buyers who were not given a mug).  Others have argued that the short duration of ownership or highly prosaic items typically used in endowment effect type studies is not sufficient to produce such a connection, conducting research demonstrating support for those points (e.g. Liersch & Rottenstreich, Working Paper).

Two paths by which attachment or self-associations increase the value of a good have been proposed (Morewedge & Giblin, 2015). An attachment theory suggests that ownership creates a non-transferable valenced association between the self and the good. The good is incorporated into the self-concept of the owner, becoming part of her identity and imbuing it with attributes related to her self-concept. Self-associations may take the form of an emotional attachment to the good. Once an attachment has formed, the potential loss of the good is perceived as a threat to the self. A real-world example of this would be an individual refusing to part with a college T-shirt because it supports one's identity as an alumnus of that university. A second route by which ownership may increase value is through a self-referential memory effect (SRE) – the better encoding and recollection of stimuli associated with the self-concept. People have a better memory for goods they own than goods they do not own. The self-referential memory effect for owned goods may act thus as an endogenous framing effect. During a transaction, attributes of a good may be more accessible to its owners than are other attributes of the transaction. Because most goods have more positive than negative features, this accessibility bias should result in owners more positively evaluating their goods than do non-owners.

Greater sensitivity to market demands for sellers 
Sellers may dictate a price based on the desires of multiple potential buyers, whereas buyers may consider their own taste. This can lead to differences between buying and selling prices because the market price is typically higher than one's idiosyncratic price estimate. According to this account, the endowment effect can be viewed as under-pricing for buyers compared to the market price; or over-pricing for sellers compared to their individual taste. Two recent lines of study support this argument. Weaver and Frederick (2012)   presented  their participants with retail prices of products, and then asked them to specify either their buying or selling price for these products. The results revealed that sellers’ valuations were closer to the known retail prices than those of buyers. A second line of studies is a meta-analysis of buying and selling of lotteries. A review of over 30 empirical studies  showed that selling prices were closer to the lottery's expected value, which is the normative price of the lottery: hence the endowment effect was consistent with buyers’ tendency to under-price lotteries as compared to the normative price. One possible reason for this tendency of buyers to indicate lower prices is their risk aversion. By contrast, sellers may assume that the market is heterogeneous enough to include buyers with potential risk neutrality and therefore adjust their price closer to a risk neutral expected value.

Biased information processing theories 
Several cognitive accounts of the endowment effect suggest that it is induced by the way endowment status changes the search for, attention to, recollection of, and weighting of information regarding the transaction. Frames evoked by acquisition of a good (e.g., buying, choosing it rather than another good) may increase the cognitive accessibility of information favoring the decision to keep one's money and not acquire the good. By contrast, frames evoked by disposition of the good (e.g., selling) may increase the cognitive accessibility of information favoring the decision to keep the good rather than trade or dispose of it for money (for a review, see Morewedge & Giblin, 2015). For example, Johnson and colleagues (2007) found that prospective mug buyers tended to recall reasons to keep their money before recalling reasons to buy the mug, whereas sellers tended to recall reasons to keep their mug before reasons to sell it for money.

Evolutionary arguments
Huck, Kirchsteiger & Oechssler (2005) have raised the hypothesis that natural selection may favor individuals whose preferences embody an endowment effect given that it may improve one's bargaining position in bilateral trades. Thus in a small tribal society with a few alternative sellers (i.e. where the buyer may not have the option of moving to an alternative seller), having a predisposition towards embodying the endowment effect may be evolutionarily beneficial. This may be linked with findings (Shogren, et al., 1994) that suggest the endowment effect is less strong when the relatively artificial sense of scarcity induced in experimental settings is lessened. Countervailing evidence for an evolutionary account is provided by studies showing that the endowment effect is moderated by exposure to modern exchange markets (e.g., hunter gatherer tribes with market exposure are more likely to exhibit the endowment effect than tribes that do not), and that the endowment effect is moderated by culture (Maddux et al., 2010).

Criticisms
Some economists have questioned the effect's existence. Hanemann (1991) noted that economic theory only suggests that WTP and WTA should be equal for goods which are close substitutes, so observed differences in these measures for goods such as environmental resources and personal health can be explained without reference to an endowment effect. Shogren, et al. (1994) noted that the experimental technique used by Kahneman, Knetsch and Thaler (1990) to demonstrate the endowment effect created a situation of artificial scarcity. They performed a more robust experiment with the same goods used by Kahneman, Knetsch and Thaler (chocolate bars and mugs) and found little evidence of the endowment effect in substitutable goods, acknowledging the endowment effect as valid for goods without substitutes—non-renewable Earth resources being an example of these. Others have argued that the use of hypothetical questions and experiments involving small amounts of money tells us little about actual behavior (e.g. Hoffman and Spitzer, 1993, p. 69, n. 23) with some research supporting these points (e.g., Kahneman, Knetsch and Thaler, 1990, Harless, 1989) and others not (e.g. Knez, Smith and Williams, 1985).   More recently, Plott and Zeiler have challenged the endowment effect theory by arguing that observed disparities between WTA and WTP measures are not reflective of human preferences, but rather such disparities stem from faulty experimental designs.

Implications
Herbert Hovenkamp (1991) has argued that the presence of an endowment effect has significant implications for law and economics, particularly in regard to welfare economics. He argues that the presence of an endowment effect indicates that a person has no indifference curve (see however Hanemann, 1991) rendering the neoclassical tools of welfare analysis useless, concluding that courts should instead use WTA as a measure of value. Fischel (1995) however, raises the counterpoint that using WTA as a measure of value would deter the development of a nation's infrastructure and economic growth. The endowment effect changes the shape of the indifference curves substantially Similarly, another study that is focused on the Strategic Reallocations for Endowment analyses how it is the case that economics's agents welfare could potentially increase if they change their endowment holding.

The endowment effect has also been raised as a possible explanation for the lack of demand for reverse mortgage opportunities in the United States (contracts in which a home owner sells back his property to the bank in exchange for an annuity) (Huck, Kirchsteiger & Oechssler, 2005).

See also

 Escalation of commitment
 Mere ownership effect
 Loss aversion
 Omission bias
 Behavioral economics
 List of cognitive biases
 Sunk costs
 Transaction cost
 IKEA effect

References

External links
 

 Wright, Josh (2005). The Endowment Effect's Disappearing Act, and (2009) What's Wrong With the Endowment Effect?
 The "Mystery" of the Endowment Effect, Per Bylund, December 28, 2011
 What Explains Observed Reluctance to Trade? A Comprehensive Literature Review

Cognitive biases
Behavioral finance
Prospect theory